The 1963 Chatham Cup was the 36th annual nationwide knockout football competition in New Zealand.

The competition was run on a regional basis, with regional associations each holding separate qualifying rounds. Teams taking part in the final rounds are known to have included Otangarei United, Blockhouse Bay, North Shore United, Papatoetoe, Hamilton Technical Old Boys, Kahukura (Rotorua), Eastern Union (Gisborne), Moturoa (New Plymouth), Hastings United, Wanganui United, St. Andrews (Manawatu), Wellington Marist, Nelson Rangers, Christchurch Nomads, Timaru Thistle, Northern (Dunedin), and Invercargill Thistle. It is known that unfancied side Otematata, from Otago's Maniototo district caused a surprise by reaching the last 16 stage.

The 1963 final
During the early 1960s North Shore were by far the strongest team in the country. This was their fourth final in five years, and with the Chatham Cup they completed a treble which included the Auckland regional league and the Rothmans Cup competition. They easily accounted for the Christchurch team of Nomads in the final, and with the exception of the tail-end of the first half dominated the match. The only goal of the first period came through Shore's Middleton (some sources say winger Peter Oden), but the lead was doubled ten minutes after the break through a header from Peter Maynard. McNicholl (some sources say Oden) added a third and North Shore coasted for the remainder of the match, allowing Nomads' Robin Muirson to gain a consolation goal for the southerners.

Results

First round

Second round

Last 32

Last 16

Last eight ("Zone finals")

Semi-finals ("Island finals")

Final

Note: Some sources, such as Hilton (1991), give North Shore's goalscorers as Oden 2, Maynard.

References

Rec.Sport.Soccer Statistics Foundation New Zealand 1963 page

Chatham Cup
Chatham Cup
Chatham Cup
August 1963 sports events in New Zealand